Gaston Bardet (1 April 1907 – 30 May 1989) was a French architect and writer. In his later works of the 1970s, Bardet used a pseudonym, signing his works Jean-Gaston.

20th-century French architects
French urban planners
People from Vichy
1907 births
1989 deaths
20th-century French non-fiction writers
20th-century French male writers